Donahoe is a surname. Notable people with the surname include:

Art Donahoe (born 1940), former lawyer and political figure in Nova Scotia, Canada
Art Donahoe (born 1950), American wrestler and weightlifter; 3-time world medalist in Masters Weightlifting; self-described "sweetheart of a guy."
Eileen Donahoe, appointed by President Barack Obama as U.S. Ambassador to the United Nations Human Rights Council in Geneva, Switzerland
Emily Donahoe, American actress and producer
John Donahoe (born 1960), American businessman who served as president and CEO of eBay from 2008 to 2015
Jonny Donahoe, British comedian, writer and performer
Patrick A. Donahoe, appointed Santa Clara University's 24th president
Patrick Donahoe (born 1811), publisher who founded influential magazines for the Irish Catholic community
Patrick R. Donahoe, the 73rd United States Postmaster General, appointed in 2010
Richard Donahoe, Q.C., K.S.G. (1909–2000), Canadian lawyer and politician
Terry Donahoe (1944–2005), former Nova Scotia opposition leader, cabinet minister, and MLA
Tom Donahoe, senior director of player personnel for the Philadelphia Eagles

See also
Donahoe Act or California Master Plan for Higher Education of 1960
Cutler-Donahoe Bridge, 79-foot (24 m) long covered bridge in Madison County, Iowa
Donoghue (disambiguation)
Donaghmore (disambiguation)